Amanda Hillwood (born Amanda Mary Smith; 26 February 1957) is an English actress.

Biography
Hillwood is the daughter of Mark and Angela Smith (née Angela Hill-Wood, granddaughter of Sir Samuel Hill-Wood, 1st Baronet). Through her mother, she is a descendant of James Hamilton, 5th Duke of Hamilton and thus, because of the special remainder of that title, is distantly in line for the Dukedom of Hamilton.

Hillwood is best known for her roles as Lyn Turtle in the BBC TV series A Very Peculiar Practice and as Doctor Grayling Russell in the ITV detective series Inspector Morse. She also appeared in the HTV drama Robin of Sherwood in May 1986, portraying the Sheriff of Nottingham's sister-in-law, Lady Isobel.

She is married to Canadian US actor Matt Frewer (best known for playing the title role in Max Headroom). They have one daughter.

Hillwood and Frewer divide their time between Malibu, California, and the Gatineau Hills of Quebec.

Film & TV

References

External links

English television actresses
Living people
1957 births
English expatriates in the United States
20th-century English actresses